Eatoniella latebricola is a species of marine gastropod mollusc in the family Eatoniellidae. It was first described by Winston F. Ponder in 1965. It is endemic to the waters of New Zealand.

Description

The shell of Eatoniella latebricola is yellowish-white, with a white aperture. The mollusc itself has large eyes at the base of its cephalic tentacles. The species measures 1.65 millimetres by 1.05 millimetres.

Distribution

The species is Endemic to New Zealand. The holotype was collected by Ponder himself from Muriwai beach in West Auckland, underneath Durvillaea sp. seaweed. The species has been predominantly identified on the west coast of the North Island on seaweeds, and has also been found as far south as Haast on the West Coast, the east coast of the North Island, and Manawatāwhi / Three Kings Islands. In 2003 dead specimens of the species was identified on Cuvier Island on the east coast of New Zealand, where Durvillaea is not present. It was theorised that the species might live on algal holdfasts, such as the kelp species Ecklonia radiata.

References

Eatoniellidae
Gastropods described in 1965
Gastropods of New Zealand
Endemic fauna of New Zealand
Endemic molluscs of New Zealand
Molluscs of the Pacific Ocean
Taxa named by Winston Ponder